Choara may refer to:
Choara (moth)
Choara, Morocco
Choara (Parthia)